Ryan Scott Wagner (born July 15, 1982) is an American former professional baseball relief pitcher. He played in Major League Baseball (MLB) for the Cincinnati Reds and the Washington Nationals. Wagner was an All-American closer for the University of Houston.

Early life
Wagner played college baseball with the Houston Cougars in 2002 and 2003. In his second year there, Wagner set a school record by recording 15 saves and he had 148 strikeouts in  innings pitched. His ratio of 16.8 strikeouts per nine innings broke an NCAA Division I record that was almost 40 years old. He was named a First-Team All-American by several organizations. 

Shortly before the 2003 Major League Baseball draft, Baseball America said that Wagner should be a mid-first-round draft choice, having passed a player named Brad Sullivan as the most in-demand pitcher on the University of Houston staff. The publication said that Wagner had "the most unhittable slider in the draft" as his primary pitch, but it noted that Wagner's delivery made some scouts worry about the risk of an arm injury. Wagner was selected in the first round (14th overall) by the Reds in the 2003 draft.

Career
When Wagner debuted with the Cincinnati Reds in 2003, he was the first player from that year's draft to make the major leagues. He appeared in 108 games over the next 2+ seasons. In , Wagner was back in the minors when the Reds included him in an 8-player trade that sent Austin Kearns and Felipe López to the Washington Nationals in exchange for Gary Majewski, Royce Clayton, Bill Bray, Brendan Harris, and Daryl Thompson.

Wagner appeared in 14 games for Washington in  before going on the disabled list. He missed the remainder of the 2007 season after having surgery to repair a torn labrum in his right shoulder. Wagner, along with Pete Orr and Chad Cordero, rejected his assignment to Triple-A, becoming a free agent on October 30, 2008. Shortly thereafter, Wagner re-signed with Washington.

Wagner announced his retirement from baseball on May 18, 2009.

References

External links

1982 births
Living people
People from Yoakum, Texas
Baseball players from Texas
Major League Baseball pitchers
Cincinnati Reds players
Washington Nationals players
Houston Cougars baseball players
All-American college baseball players
Chattanooga Lookouts players
Louisville Bats players
New Orleans Zephyrs players
Potomac Nationals players
Columbus Clippers players
Syracuse Chiefs players